Alexander Axén (born 15 October 1971, Örebro, Sweden) is a Swedish football manager and TV pundit.

References

1971 births
Living people
Swedish football managers
IK Start non-playing staff
Swedish expatriate sportspeople in Norway
Örebro SK managers
Sportspeople from Örebro